The 2023 Nigerian Senate elections in Enugu State will be held on 25 February 2023, to elect the 3 federal Senators from Enugu State, one from each of the state's three senatorial districts. The elections will coincide with the 2023 presidential election, as well as other elections to the Senate and elections to the House of Representatives; with state elections being held two weeks later. Primaries were held between 4 April and 9 June 2022.

Background
In the previous Senate elections, two of three incumbent senators were returned with Utazi Chukwuka (PDP-North) and Ike Ekweremadu (PDP-West) winning re-election while Gilbert Nnaji (PDP-East) lost renomination. In the East district, Chimaroke Nnamani retained the seat for the PDP with 88% of the vote; the PDP also held the other two seats as Chukwuka was re-elected with 86% of the vote in the North district while Ekweremadu was returned with 78% in the West district. These results were a part of a continuation of the PDP's control of the state as Governor Ifeanyi Ugwuanyi was re-elected with over 95% of the vote in the gubernatorial election and the party won a majority in the House of Assembly. The PDP also swept all House of Representatives seats to the APC and the state was easily won by PDP presidential nominee Atiku Abubakar.

At the beginning of the term, Ekweremadu lost his longtime Deputy Senate President office but remained a prominent senator until June 2022 when he and his wife were arrested in the United Kingdom for an organ-harvesting conspiracy. For his colleagues, Chukwuka was noted for his criticisms of Buhari while Nnamani often got into online arguments.

Overview

Summary

Enugu East 

The Enugu East Senatorial District covers the local government areas of Enugu North, Enugu South, Isi Uzo, Nkanu East, and Nkanu West. The incumbent Chimaroke Nnamani (PDP) was elected with 88.3% of the vote in 2019 and is seeking re-election.

Primary elections

All Progressives Congress 

On 28 May, the sole candidate—Adaku Ogbu-Aguocha—won the primary unopposed at the party's zonal secretariat in Enugu. After the primary, Ogbu-Aguocha said 'the days of sleeping senators are over for the district.'

People's Democratic Party 

The Agbani-held primary resulted in Nnamani winning renomination unanimously over former state government Chief of Staff Ifeoma Nwobodo and three other candidates.

Campaign
In the midst of the senatorial campaign, Nnamani rose to national attention in the presidential race as a prominent supporter of APC presidential nominee Bola Tinubu despite being a member of the PDP. Due to this cross-party endorsement, Nnamani's PDP membership was suspended by the party's National Working Committee in January 2023 due to "anti-party activities." In response, Nnamani decried the suspension process and vowed to continue his political career. Nevertheless, his continued support for Tinubu led the NWC to expel him in mid-February. Nnamani again rejected the process, and refused to stop his campaign or Tinubu support.

Just days to the election, LP nominee Oyibo Chukwu was assassinated in an ambush after campaigning in Agbani on 22 February. In confirming the news, LP gubernatorial nominee Chijioke Edeoga revealed that at least five others had been murdered in the attack and blamed "political parties that felt threatened by the rise of the Labour Party in the state and are afraid they may lose the Saturday’s election." The next day, the Labour Party requested that the election be postponed; INEC Chairman Mahmood Yakubu said a postponement could be ordered as soon as the commission received an official notification of death from the LP. The LP later formally notified INEC of the death, leading the commission to postpone the election to 11 March—the date of state elections. In a replacement primary, Kelvin Chukwu—a lawyer and Oyibo Chukwu's brother—won the LP nomination on 5 March.

General election

Results

Enugu North 

The Enugu North Senatorial District covers the local government areas of Igbo Etiti, Igbo Eze North, Igbo Eze South, Nsukka, Udenu, and Uzo Uwani. The incumbent Utazi Chukwuka (PDP), who was elected with 86.1% of the vote in 2019, declined to seek re-election.

Primary elections

All Progressives Congress 

Simon Ejike Eze was submitted to INEC as the APC nominee.

People's Democratic Party 

Before the primary, Chukwuka announced his retirement in favor of outgoing Governor Ifeanyi Ugwuanyi's candidacy. On the primary date, Ugwuanyi was nominated in a landslide over three other candidates at the Nsukka Township Stadium. After the results were announced, Ugwuanyi thanked delegates.

Campaign
In the midst of the senatorial campaign, Ugwuanyi rose to national attention in the presidential race as a member of the G5 group—a grouping of five PDP governors which refused to support PDP presidential nominee Atiku Abubakar. In the senatorial race, analysts labeled the election as a three-way race between Eze, Ugwuanyi, and Ezea (LP). By January 2023, rumors emerged that Ezea might withdraw in favor of Ugwuanyi as a part of a deal whereby the G5 would back LP presidential nominee Peter Obi; however, Ezea vehemently denied the reports and vowed to remain in the election.

General election

Results

Enugu West 

The Enugu West Senatorial District covers the local government areas of Aninri, Awgu, Ezeagu, Oji River, and Udi. Incumbent Ike Ekweremadu (PDP) was re-elected with 78.3% of the vote in 2019. In March 2022, Ekweremadu announced that he would run for governor of Enugu State instead of seeking re-election; Ekweremadu withdrew on the day of the gubernatorial primary.

Primary elections

All Progressives Congress 

On the primary date, Oby Nwofor was the only candidate and thus was nominated by affirmation at the primary. However, Nicholas Chika Ezeh later replaced Nwofor as the nominee.

People's Democratic Party 

The indirect primary ended with Osita Ngwu emerging as the nominee over former MHR Ogbuefi Ozomgbachi by a 53% margin.

General election

Results

See also 
 2023 Nigerian Senate election
 2023 Nigerian elections

Notes

References 

Enugu State senatorial elections
2023 Enugu State elections
Enugu State Senate elections